Assassination in Davos is a 1974 Swiss thriller film directed by Rolf Lyssy and starring Peter Bollag, Gert Haucke and Marianne Kehlau. It is based on the assassination of the Swiss Nazi Wilhelm Gustloff by a student in 1936. The film was selected as the Swiss entry for the Best Foreign Language Film at the 48th Academy Awards, but was not accepted as a nominee.

Cast
 Peter Bollag – David Frankfurter
 Gert Haucke – Wilhelm Gustloff
 Marianne Kehlau – Frau Hedwig Gustloff
 Hilde Ziegler – Doris Steiger
 Wolfram Berger – Zvonko
 Michael Rittermann – Rabbi Frankfurter
 Alfred Schlageter – Rabbi Salomon
 Peter Arens – Procureur de l'État
 Max Knapp – President de la Cour

See also
 List of submissions to the 48th Academy Awards for Best Foreign Language Film
 List of Swiss submissions for the Academy Award for Best Foreign Language Film

References

External links
 

1974 films
1970s thriller films
1970s German-language films
Films directed by Rolf Lyssy
Films set in 1936
Swiss historical films